Klasztorne may refer to the following places:
Klasztorne, Pomeranian Voivodeship (north Poland)
Klasztorne, Choszczno County in West Pomeranian Voivodeship (north-west Poland)
Klasztorne, Gryfino County in West Pomeranian Voivodeship (north-west Poland)